DXCJ (102.3 FM), broadcasting as Barangay FM 102.3 (or Barangay FM 102.3 Super Radyo), is a radio station owned and operated by GMA Network subsidiary Radio GMA. The station's studio and transmitter are located at the 3rd floor of PBC Building, Cagampang St., General Santos.

History

1996-2014: Campus Radio
The station, along with the now-defunct DXBB-AM, was established On May 18, 1996 as Campus Radio. It bared its first slogan "Always and Forever". In 2001, the slogan was changed into "Kuyawa Ui!" (shocking), because of the series of bombings in Gensan last 2003 and the negative effects of the slogan on the station. The team decided to modify it into "Wow! Nindutah Ah!", which is also used in Davao City-based Campus Radio until today. In 2010, it carried the slogan "The Best!", which was used by its flagship station back in the 80s. In 2012, it changed its slogan to "Ayos!".

2014-present: Barangay FM

On February 17, 2014, Campus Radio was relaunched as Barangay 102.3 as part of RGMA's brand unification. On December 21, 2014, a hostage-taking occurred when a man named Gabby Batican went into the station to call for assistance after being threatened with death. After growing suspicious about Batican, who is the cousin of one of the station's DJs (DJ Angel), the radio station staff alerted the police. Batican may have been under the influence of narcotics when he took the victims hostage, and the hostage drama lasted for more than an hour.

In 2021, Barangay FM added news and talk to its programming under the Super Radyo branding, similar to Kalibo-based Barangay RU. In addition to local programming, the station also simulcasts selected DZBB-AM programs, as well as GMA Regional TV One Mindanao, 24 Oras and Saksi.

References

Barangay FM stations
Radio stations in General Santos
Radio stations established in 1996